Mycobacterium phocaicum is a species of Mycobacterium.

References

External links
Type strain of Mycobacterium phocaicum at BacDive -  the Bacterial Diversity Metadatabase

Acid-fast bacilli
phocaicum